Terry Deglau (August 17, 1940 – September 14, 2019) was the portrait photographer chosen by the United Nations to take the group photo of the world's leaders at the 2000 United Nations Millennium Project in New York City.  He had done a similar photograph for the UN's 50th anniversary celebration in 1995, and has done portraits of five U.S. Presidents.

Deglau also produced and organized the photography of the 100 4th of July people for the "Photo of the Century" July 4, 1999 in Philadelphia.

The son of photographer Henry Deglau, Terry Deglau was born in Latrobe, Pennsylvania.  He earned his B.S. in Photographic Science from Rochester Institute of Technology in 1964, and a Master of Photography degree with the Professional Photographers of America Association.  He served for many years as Eastman Kodak's liaison to the professional photographic community.

Deglau was the recipient of many honors for his photography, including the Professional Photographers of America Director's Award, WPPI's Lifetime Achievement Award, and two PPA National Awards from Professional Photographers of Pennsylvania and Ohio Professional Photographers.

Terry Deglau is a distant relative of Canadian Olympic swimming star Jessica Deglau.

He died on September 14, 2019 in Greensburg, Pennsylvania.

References

External links
United Nations Millennium Summit photo by Terry Deglau
CNN story about Photo of the Century in Philadelphia

1940 births
2019 deaths
People from Latrobe, Pennsylvania
American photographers